John Rush may refer to:

 John Rush (cricketer) (1910–1982), Australian cricketer
 John Rush (Canadian football) (born 1993), Canadian football fullback
 John Rush (Medal of Honor) (1837–1916), Union Navy fireman and Medal of Honor recipient
 John H. Rush (1874–1958), American football player and coach and track athlete
 John Rush (tech entrepreneur) (born 1989), Tech entrepreneur, founder of marsx.dev